Warnock is a surname. It originated with the Mac-Gille-Warnocks (MacIlvernocks clan) in Scotland prior to 1066; its motto is "Ne oublie" (Do not forget).  Notable people with the surname include:

List of people with the surname
 Barbara Mills née Warnock (1940–2011), British barrister
 Barton H. Warnock (1911–1998), a botanist and taxonomist
 Bryan Warnock, originator of Warnock's dilemma
Ceri Warnock, British-born New Zealand environmental legal scholar
 Dave Warnock (1910–1976), Scottish footballer (Aberdeen)
 David Warnock (1865–1932), Scottish-Canadian politician and veterinarian
 Diana Warnock (born 1940), Australian radio broadcaster and politician
 Geoffrey Warnock (1923-1995), British philosopher and former Vice-Chancellor of Oxford University
 James Warnock (engineer), American engineer
 Jimmy Warnock (1912-1987), Belfast boxer who fought and beat Benny Lynch when World Champion in 1936 and again in 1937
 John Warnock (born 1940), American co-founder of Adobe Systems software company and inventor of Warnock algorithm
 Mary Warnock, Baroness Warnock (1924–2019), British philosopher and chair of committees that produced reports about education and medicine
 Matthew Warnock (born 1984), Australian rules footballer
 Neil Warnock (born 1948), English football manager
 Raphael Warnock (born 1969), American pastor and US Senator in Georgia
 Robert Warnock (born 1987), Australian rules footballer
 Stephen Warnock (born 1981), English footballer (Liverpool, Blackburn Rovers, Aston Villa, Leeds United, Derby County)

See also
 Warnock (disambiguation)

References

Surnames of English origin
Surnames of British Isles origin
English-language surnames